The Morrisburg Lions are a Canadian junior ice hockey team based in Morrisburg, Ontario.  They are members of the National Capital Junior Hockey Leaguecommencing with the 2015-16 season.  Prior to this the Lions were members of the Eastern Ontario Junior Hockey League (EOJBHL) of Hockey Eastern Ontario and [[Hockey Canada]

History
At the conclusion of the 2014-15 season, the league announced it was re-organized to be more of a dedicated developmental league to the Central Canada Hockey League and renamed the league Central Canada Hockey League Tier 2.  Initially,  the league was to downsize to twelve teams (one feeder club for each Tier 1 team), however, it reduced to 16 teams, eliminating 6 of the current franchises, including the Akwesasne Wolves, Morrisburg Lions, Almonte Thunder, Gananoque Islanders, Gatineau Mustangs, and Shawville Pontiacs.

Morrisburg applied for membership to the National Capital Junior Hockey League. In April the Lions were accepted by a 9-0 vote.

Season-by-season results

References

External links
Morrisburg Lions Website
National Capital Junior Hockey League Webpage

Eastern Ontario Junior B Hockey League teams
Ice hockey clubs established in 1971
1971 establishments in Ontario
Megan Thompson